Skill Football Club de Bruxelles was a Belgian football club from its creation in 1896 to 1902 when it merged with Daring Club de Bruxelles.  The club played in the first division from 1899 to 1902 and finished respectively 6th (and last, with 0 point, but was not relegated), 5th (on 9) and 5th (on 6).

References
Belgian football clubs history
RSSSF Archive

Association football clubs established in 1896
Skill Bruxelles
Association football clubs disestablished in 1902
1896 establishments in Belgium
1902 disestablishments in Belgium
Defunct football clubs in Belgium
Belgian Pro League clubs